Natán Armando Rivera Alas (born 12 December 1998) is a Salvadoran athlete specialising in the pole vault.

Still a youth athlete, he won the gold medal at the 2015 NACAC Championships although in rather unusual circumstances. His rivals having much better personal bests than Rivera, who managed to jump 4.70 meters, entered the competition much higher but none of them actually cleared the bar. This left him as the sole athlete to record a valid jump and the gold medalist. This victory earned him a spot at the 2015 World Championships in Beijing, where, however, the opening height of 5.25 metres, way above his then PB of 4.70 metres, proved too much for him.

His current personal bests in the event are 5.35 meters outdoors (Austin, TX 2019) and 5.20 metres indoors (Houston, TX 2019). Both are national records.

Competition record

See also
 El Salvador at the 2015 World Championships in Athletics

References

1998 births
Living people
Male pole vaulters
Salvadoran pole vaulters
Place of birth missing (living people)
Salvadoran male athletes
World Athletics Championships athletes for El Salvador
Central American Games gold medalists for El Salvador
Central American Games medalists in athletics
Athletes (track and field) at the 2019 Pan American Games
Pan American Games competitors for El Salvador